The KTM 390 Duke and RC 390 are  displacement single-cylinder engine  motorcycles assembled by Bajaj Auto, and KTM Asia Motorcycle Manufacturing, Inc. (KAMMI) for the Austrian manufacturer KTM. The bikes were developed under a joint program of Bajaj and KTM engineers, in which the concept was developed in Austria, while everything else, including design and final product development, was done in India by Bajaj. The 390 Duke standard debuted at the 2012 EICMA show in Milan, Italy, and went on sale in India and the Philippines in 2013 and in the US in 2015. The RC 390 sport bike was presented at EICMA the following year. After the Duke's initial release, KTM CEO Stefan Pierer announced plans to export the 390 Duke to the US for 2014. Bajaj said eventually the bike will be sold in 80 countries worldwide.

Pierer said in December 2015 that KTM and Bajaj plan to replace the 125, 200, and the 390-series Duke and RC lines in 2017, based on all new platforms, in part tarnavo meet Euro IV emissions standards, and to incorporate new technologies such as ride-by-wire.

390 Duke
In its home market, the 390 Duke's engine size and weight place it in the mid-range category, and it sells for more than three times the average price of a motorcycle in India. As one Indian reviewer put it "The 390 Duke may well be a simple little A2 license commuter for the European rider, but in the environs of Mumbai traffic, it's a proper rocket-powered scalpel." In the US market, the same motorcycle is considered small-displacement, lightweight, and relatively inexpensive. Similarly, the UK Sunday Times said, "Given that the 390 Duke weighs less than 150kg when it's full of fuel, you have to sit on it to stop it blowing away. Such a bike in the UK would also appeal to experienced riders looking for a practical and efficient commuter bike and runabout. The 390 Duke won the 2013–14 Jury's Choice Bike of the Year in The Bloomberg TV India Autocar India Awards.

The brakes were considered to be "the most obvious flaw on the 390".

It has a kickstand sensor and switchable dual-channel ABS but no Cornering ABS, Combined ABS, traction control system, engine braking control, adaptive brake light, or cornering lights.

As a feature, it has no keyless ignition but only optional immobiliser key and alarm system.

2017 update
After 2017, the 390 series' front brake disc was increased from 300 mm to 320 mm. The headlight was redesigned and converted to LED. The display became a color TFT panel with phone pairing capability. The brake and clutch levers were also made manually adjustable.

2018 update 
In 2018, KTM updated its Duke 390 with some minor changes, where it added a deflector plate on the left side of the chassis, to avoid exhaust heat near the riders leg. The Duke 390 in India gained new features and updates. The Duke 390 comes with a daytime running light, and is on Euro IV emission standards.

2020 update 
The bike was made BS6 compliant and a bi-directional quickshifter was added.

2022 update 

RC 390

A sport bike version of the 390 Duke, the KTM RC 390 was presented at the 2013 EICMA motorcycle show in Italy, though most details had been leaked a few weeks earlier. With a fuel capacity , the wet weight would be . The frame of the RC is a different single piece trellis frame than the Duke, which KTM says is stiffer than the 390 Duke. The tires are Metzeler 110/70ZR17 front and 150/60ZR17 rear. Where the Duke has a steering head angle of 65° (or 25° rake), the RC's fork has a steeper 66.5° head angle (or 23.5° rake). The  wheelbase is  shorter than the Duke. The same ByBre disc brakes with switchable dual channel ABS, and WP 43 mm front fork and rear shock are used on the RC 390.

KTM added a racing version of the RC 390, the RC 390 Cup for use by motorcycle racers ages 13 to 21 in the ADAC Junior Cup, a MotoGP event. The RC 390 Cup has no lights or mirrors, and no ABS to reduce weight, and an upgraded WP suspension, fully adjustable front and rear.

Braking distance was measured at 148.2 feet from 60-0 mph with ABS disabled and 151.7 feet without ABS disabled.

It has a kickstand sensor but does not have Combined ABS, cornering lights, adaptive brake light, or engine braking control.

As a feature, it has no keyless ignition but only optional immobiliser key and alarm system.

2017 update 

KTM revised the RC 390 in 2017 by adding a slipper clutch, adjustable brake levers, ride-by-wire throttle, a larger 320 mm front brake rotor, larger mirrors, and some cosmetic and ergonomic changes.

2020 update 
The bike was made BS6 compliant and a new color option was offered.

2022 update 
Cornering ABS and a traction control system were added. A bi-directional quickshifter is optional.

Notes

References

External links

Bajaj Auto
390
Motorcycles introduced in 2013
Standard motorcycles
Sport bikes